Montevideo City Torque is a Uruguayan football club based in Montevideo. The club currently plays in the Uruguayan Primera División, the first division of Uruguayan league system, having achieved promotion to the Primera División for the first time ahead of the 2018 season.

Founded in 2007 as Club Atlético Torque, the club has been owned by the City Football Group (CFG) since April 2017, which eventually resulted in the change to the club's name in 2020. Montevideo City Torque shares ties with teams such as Manchester City, New York City and Melbourne City, as clubs that are also owned by CFG.

History 

Club Atlético Torque were founded on 26 December 2007 by Cancún-based Uruguayan businessman Raúl Aquino Reynoso, building on a vision of achieving glory from scratch. To help him build his dream, Aquino contacted Marcelo Yaurreche, an electromechanic by trade, who had blogged on the concept of sporting ventures. Yaurreche's line of work ultimately went on to inspire the name of the team through the mechanical principle of torque as an indication of strength. The nascent club's first season of competition was played in the local Liga de Punta Carretas.

Segunda División Amateur 

Starting from the 2008–09, Torque entered the Uruguayan football league system in the third (and lowest) tier, the Segunda División Amateur. Their first season was very positive, going unbeaten for the 11 games of the Clausura tournament before losing the play-off for the overall league title against Oriental. Oriental opted to turn down their promotion to the Segunda División, prompting Torque to submit an application to take it up in their place, but their application was rejected.

In the following seasons the club continued to place highly, never finishing lower than fifth in either the Apertura or Clausura tournaments. In May 2011 Torque merged with Huracán of the Segunda División to form a new club called Huracán Torque, but by August of the same year the merger was dissolved with the new side having played no games. Torque resumed its place in the Segunda División Amateur and at the fourth time of asking finally finished top of the overall table, winning promotion to the Segunda División for the 2012–13 season.

Segunda División Profesional 

Torque's first season in professional football again finished positively with a fifth-place finish, including denying high-flyers Tacuarembó automatic promotion to the Uruguayan top tier and potentially even the league title itself with a 4–0 victory in the final game of the season. Torque themselves qualified for the promotion play-offs, where they again defeated Tacuarembó, but they ultimately lost the play-off final on penalties.

The following season was the club's first season of underachievement with Torque finishing in last place and eight points adrift of their nearest competitor. They were, however, spared the ignominy of relegation as the division expanded to 15 clubs, causing the league's organisers to opt against relegating any clubs. The following seasons offered little improvement, with the club finishing some distance from the promotion places each time.

City Football Group acquisition and promotion to the Primera División 

On 20 March 2017, Uruguayan online sports news site Ovacion reported that the City Football Group, owners of Premier League side Manchester City and MLS team New York City FC amongst others, were close to completing negotiations for the purchase of Torque with the aim of using the club to assist in the signing of South American players. Also reported was that CFG had been working with the club for some time in anticipation of the purchase to build it a new sports complex as well as to refurbish the Estadio Juan Antonio Lavalleja in Minas with a view to relocating the side to the city in order to help establish an identity for the club as well as to give it a larger potential fanbase.

Following a series of further rumours of the imminence of the deal, it was publicly announced on 5 April 2017 that the takeover had been completed and ratified by the Uruguayan Football Association.

In 2017, led by Paulo Pezzolano, Torque formed a very strong team for the category and achieved the title with ease. Football players of the stature of Diego Martiñones, Ernesto Goñi, Hernán Figueredo, Martín Bonjour, Jonathan Cubero, Julián Lalinde and Leonardo Pais, among others; added to quality foreign reinforcements such as the Venezuelan Nahuel Ferraresi, the Colombian Javier Calle and the Argentine Valentín Castellanos. As soon as the promotion was confirmed, Pezzolano announced that he would not continue in the next season. Pablo Marini, another Argentine, was brought in to replace him.

In the debut in the Primera División, the team will be directed by the Argentine Pablo Marini.

Qualification for the play-off of the Torneo Intermedio, which Torque lost 3–2 to Nacional, was tempered by a poor run of results in both the Torneo Apertura and the Torneo Clausura, and Torque were relegated in 14th place based on average points per game at the end of the 2018 season. The 2019 season saw Torque take the Segunda División title for a second time as they beat Maldonado by three points to win the title on the final day of the season.

Name change and return to the Primera División 
On 22 January 2020 it was announced that Club Atletico Torque had changed their club name to Montevideo City Torque, with an accompanying change in team badge. The name and badge were chosen to be reflective of their links to Manchester City and the other clubs of the City Football Group. At the same time it was announced that the club would begin work on the construction of a new academy and administrative complex,   intended to be one of the most advanced academy centres in South America.

Uniform 
 First uniform: light blue shirt, black pants, black averages.
 Second uniform: white shirt, black pants, black averages.
All Torque title shirts have been light blue, but from 2016 on, the shirt has included a big blue "T" on the chest on a light blue background. The alternative shirts are generally white, although it was gray in 2013. It is currently white with a big blue "T".

Kit manufacturers

Players

First team squad

Out on loan

Club information 
Updated data for the 2018 season
 Seasons in Uruguayan Primera División: 2 (2018, 2020)
 Debut: 2018
 First match: Torque 2–4 Nacional, on 3 February 2018
 First goal in history: Jhoaho Hinestroza (Torque 2–4 Nacional, 3 February 2018)
 Seasons in Uruguayan Segunda División: 7 (2012–13 to 2017, 2019).
 Debut: 2012–13
 Seasons in Uruguayan Tercera División: 4 (2008–09 to 2011–12)
 First match: Torque 0–2 Platense, on 12 October 2008.
 First goal in history: Gonzalo Larrosa (Torque 2–3 Uruguay Montevideo, on 16 October 2008).
 First triumph: Torque 2–1 CA Basáñez, on 1 November 2008.

Trajectory

Honours
 Segunda División
 Winners (2): 2017, 2019
 Tercera División
 Winners (1): 2011–12
 Runner-up (1): 2008–09

See also
 Manchester City FC
 Melbourne City FC
 New York City FC
 Mumbai City FC

References

External links

 El Ascenso Website

 
Football clubs in Uruguay
Football clubs in Montevideo
Association football clubs established in 2007
2007 establishments in Uruguay